Gustavo Selbach (born 25 August 1974 in Três Coroas) is a Brazilian slalom canoeist who competed at the international level from 1992 to 2010.

Competing in two Summer Olympics, he earned his best finish of 31st in the K1 event in Barcelona in 1992.

His older brother Leonardo is also a two-time Olympian in canoe slalom.

References

1974 births
Brazilian male canoeists
Canoeists at the 1992 Summer Olympics
Canoeists at the 1996 Summer Olympics
Living people
Olympic canoeists of Brazil
Brazilian people of German descent
20th-century Brazilian people